Hurricane Dalilia was the only tropical cyclone during 1989 to affect the Hawaiian Islands. A tropical disturbance developed into a tropical depression on July 11 and into Hurricane Dalilia on July 13. Dalilia crossed 140°W shortly after reaching its maximum intensity and entered the Central Pacific Hurricane Center's area of responsibility. The storm accelerated, and headed directly towards the Hawaiian Islands. Hurricane Dalilia passed just south of the Hawaiian Islands as a tropical storm before dissipating July 21 as it interacted with a trough. It then interacted with the remains of Tropical Storm Erick and reformed into a depression on July 24. A trough then accelerated the remnants towards the Aleutian Islands on July 28. The cyclone's effects were minimal. There was high surf, and some gusty winds. Damage was minor, and mainly limited to downed power lines.

Meteorological history

Hurricane Dalilia originated out of a tropical disturbance embedded in the Intertropical Convergence Zone (ITCZ) during early July 1989 off the west coast of Africa. As the system became increasingly organized, the disturbance's outflow suppressed the ITCZ. By July 9, the disturbance had entered the eastern Pacific ocean and sufficient convective development to prompt Dvorak Technique intensity estimates. Upon being designated a depression, it was still partially embedded within the ITCZ, inhibiting rapid development. In fact, the National Hurricane Center did not operationally begin advisories on the depression until almost 24 hours later. After the National Hurricane Center began issuing advisories, the depression quickly became more well-defined, as it began separating from the ITCZ on July 12. In addition, significant further intensification was expected, as sea surface temperatures (SST's) were greater than 78.8 °F (26 °C). Only a few hours later, satellite imagery showed a significant increase in convection. Tracking in a general west-northwest direction, the depression intensified into a tropical storm late on July 12, at which time it was given the name Dalilia by the NHC.

Dalilia rapidly intensified after becoming a tropical storm, and several computer models predicted it to reach winds of 100 mph (155 km/h) by July 15. Six hours later, the National Hurricane Center upgraded Dalilia to a hurricane, after winds were estimated at 75 mph (120 km/h), and satellite imagery suggested that the hurricane was continuing to organize. However, post-storm analysis show this upgrade as several hours premature. While Dalilia developed well-defined spiral convective bands, it had remained a minimal hurricane, since no eye had formed. Despite earlier forecasts for low wind shear values, upper-level winds appeared less favorable for further intensification, after water vapor imagery showed several upper-level low pressure areas to the north and northeast of Dalilia. Although the National Hurricane Center operationally held the intensity of Dalilia at minimal hurricane status for a while; post-analysis data show that Dalilia was slowly intensifying.  By July 16, the storm developed a central dense overcast, leading to further intensification. Although the storm tracked near cool waters, a well-developed outflow allowed it to maintain hurricane-intensity.

Shortly before crossing into the Central Pacific Hurricane Center's area of responsibility, the storm reached its peak intensity with winds of 90 mph (150 km/h) and a central pressure of 977 mbar (hPa; 28.85 inHg). After crossing 140°W, Dalilia weakened to a minimal hurricane. The storm maintained this intensity until July 19, at which time the system slowed and turned northwest. The following day, the weakening tropical storm brushed the Hawaiian Islands to the south, eventually curving away from the island chain on July 21. Later that day, Dalilia further weakened to a tropical depression, with the Central Pacific Hurricane Center issuing their final advisory at that time. The remnants of the former hurricane continued to track northwest. On July 24, the system interacted with the remnants of Tropical Storm Erick and may have briefly re-attained tropical storm intensity; however, by July 28, the storm was rapidly tracking north through the Aleutian Islands. The remnants of Dalilia dissipated shortly thereafter.

Preparations and impact
In preparation of the storm, a high surf advisory and a tropical storm watch were issued for the Hawaiian Islands. Officials urged residents to stock up on supplies and they closed beaches. Even though the Central Pacific Hurricane Center remarked that that watch will likely be upgraded into a hurricane warning, this failed to occur; instead, the watch was discontinued on July 20 because meteorologists were now expecting the storm to pass south of the island chain.

While tracking near the Hawaiian Islands, Dalilia produced waves up to  along south-facing coastlines. Along the coasts of Ka'u and South Kona, winds gusted up to 45 mph (75 km/h); the winds caused minor damage, mainly downed power lines. Hurricane Dalilia contributed to a record rainfall total for the month of July in Honolulu with  falling during the storm's passage. The remnants of the storm continued to produce unseasonable rains in the Northwestern Hawaiian Islands through July 28. Heavy rains caused minor flooding which forced transit officials to shut down several roads. Many power lines were down, which produced minor wind damage. Despite causing power outages, there were no reports of injuries or major property damage. Overall, impact from Tropical Storm Dalilia was less than anticipated.

See also

Other tropical cyclones named Dalilia or Dalila
List of Hawaii hurricanes

References

External links
The National Hurricane Center's Preliminary Report on Hurricane Dalilia

Dalilia
Dalilia